Marius Cornel Popa (born 31 July 1978) is a retired Romanian football player.

He started his career at the local team, Bihor Oradea in 1997 and three years later moved to FC Naţional. He managed to break into the first team in 2003 and his performances have earned him a few call-ups, although Popa has not played any minute yet for the Romania National team. He joined Poli in the winter break of the 2004/2005 season, together with National coach Cosmin Olăroiu and team-mates Gabriel Cânu, Gabriel Caramarin and Gigel Coman.

He has been the number one goalkeeper since arriving at Poli. However, he missed out on the Cupa României Final lost against Rapid Bucharest in the 2006/2007 season, when poor form and an injury a few weeks before the match offered youngster Costel Pantilimon the chance the shine. Pantilimon did not manage to hold on to his first team slot and Popa has since returned in goal.

Popa has also been called up to the Romania national team eleven times and made his debut in a friendly against Russia. He represented his country at the 2008 UEFA European Championship in Austria and Switzerland.

Honours

Player
Bihor Oradea
Divizia C: 1997–98

Coach
Luceafărul Oradea
Liga III: 2015–16

References

External links

1978 births
Living people
Sportspeople from Oradea
Association football goalkeepers
Romanian footballers
Romania international footballers
FC Bihor Oradea players
FC Politehnica Timișoara players
Liga I players
Liga II players
FC Progresul București players
FC Internațional Curtea de Argeș players
CS Pandurii Târgu Jiu players
FC Universitatea Cluj players
CS Luceafărul Oradea managers
UEFA Euro 2008 players
Romanian football managers